This is a list of world super-flyweight boxing champions (also known as junior-bantamweight), as recognized by the four major sanctioning organizations in boxing:

 The World Boxing Association (WBA), established in 1921 as the National Boxing Association (NBA). The WBA often recognize up to two world champions in a given weight class; Super champion and Regular champion.
 The World Boxing Council (WBC), established in 1963.
 The International Boxing Federation (IBF), established in 1983.
 The World Boxing Organization (WBO), established in 1988.

IBF

WBC

WBA

WBO

See also
List of WBA world champions
List of WBC world champions
List of IBF world champions
List of WBO world champions
 List of British world boxing champions

References

External links

Super Flyweight Champions

World boxing champions by weight class